Kansas City Barbeque is a restaurant and bar located in the harbor district of San Diego, California. Self-proclaimed as the "Top Gun Bar", it is known for being the filming location for scenes used in the film Top Gun.

Top Gun

While working in San Diego, the location director for Paramount Studios visited Kansas City Barbeque for a beer. He liked the atmosphere and brought the bar to the attention of film director Tony Scott. Scott asked the owners to shut the establishment down for a day in order use the bar for shooting.

The bar was used in a scene in which Goose and Maverick (played by Anthony Edwards and Tom Cruise, respectively) belt out "Great Balls of Fire" while seated at the piano. The now famous line by Meg Ryan, "Goose, you big stuuuuuud!  Take me to bed or lose me forever!" was uttered in the dining area of Kansas City Barbeque. The bar was also used in the final scene, where the song "You've Lost That Lovin' Feelin'" is heard playing on the jukebox.

Fire
On June 26, 2008, a fire destroyed the entire building. San Diego Fire-Rescue Department spokesman, Maurice Luque, described the building as "gutted". The fire originated in an open cooking pit in the kitchen of the restaurant and eventually spread to the building's interior. No injuries were sustained and an estimated 45 firefighters were able to extinguish the fire in 20 minutes. The damage was estimated at $400,000, excluding memorabilia and props from the film.

Establishment owner and Kansas City native, Martin Blair, began planning the building's restoration the day after the fire. It took two months to clear out the rubble from the restaurant, but the bar reopened in November 2008.

References

External links

Restaurants in California
Restaurants established in 1983
1983 establishments in California
Top Gun